Edgar Contreras may refer to:

 Edgar Contreras (surgeon) (born 1961), Dominican doctor and plastic surgeon
 Edgar Contreras (taekwondo) (born 1992), Venezuelan taekwondo athlete